Sandy Brito (born July 19, 1996) is a Dominican professional baseball pitcher who is currently free agent. He has played for the farm team of the Chunichi Dragons of Nippon Professional Baseball and in the Tampa Bay Rays organization.

Career

Tampa Bay Rays
On December 16, 2013, Brito signed a minor league contract with the Tampa Bay Rays organization. He made his professional debut in 2014 with the DSL Rays. In 2015, Brito played for the rookie ball GCL Rays, recording a 0–2 record and 5.30 ERA in 15 games. In 2016, Brito played for the rookie ball Princeton Rays, registering a 3–0 record and 4.00 ERA in 15 appearances. He did not play in a game in 2017 and allowed 2 runs in 0.2 innings for the GCL Rays in 2018 before being released on June 22, 2018.

Chunichi Dragons
In 2019, Brito was invited to a try-out with a view to signing on a permanent basis with the Chunichi Dragons of Nippon Professional Baseball (NPB) and was signed to a development player deal on 22 February. Brito's first year for the Dragons was restricted to the farm where he struggled for control and pitched 6.1 innings for a 10.80 ERA. Brito's struggles continued in 2020 for the farm team, as he recorded a ghastly 15.00 ERA in 4 appearances. He was released after the season.

References

External links

 NPB.jp

1996 births
Living people
Chunichi Dragons players
Nippon Professional Baseball pitchers
Dominican Republic expatriate baseball players in Japan
Princeton Rays players